Florence Eloise Hardt (September 17, 1917 – June 25, 2017) was an American film and television actress.

Life and career 
Hardt was born in Lawton, Oklahoma, the daughter of a Cherokee mother and German father. When she was 13, her family settled in California, where she later worked as a model. She was photographed by Tom Kelley which led to her meeting John Huston. He helped Hardt garner a contract at the Columbia Pictures. She began her career in 1941, first appearing in the film You Belong to Me.

She played uncredited roles in numerous films and made a guest-starring appearance in the anthology television series Alfred Hitchcock Presents. In 1959, she starred in the new CBS sitcom television series The Dennis O'Keefe Show playing Karen Hadley.

Hardt guest-starred in television programs including Charlie's Angels, Dr. Kildare, The Donna Reed Show, Dynasty, Death Valley Days, Lawman, Perry Mason, Columbo, and Hotel (her final credit). She played Rita Beacon in the daytime soap opera Days of Our Lives.

Family
She and husband Hans Habe had one child, a daughter, Marina Elizabeth Habe (February 23, 1951 – December 30, 1968), who was brutally murdered at age 17.

Death
Eloise Hardt died in June 2017, at the age of 99, in Palos Verdes Estates, California, U.S.

References

External links 

Rotten Tomatoes profile

1917 births
2017 deaths
Actresses from Oklahoma
American people of Cherokee descent
American people of German descent
American film actresses
American television actresses
American soap opera actresses
20th-century American actresses
American models
21st-century American women